The Jingzaijiao Tile-paved Salt Fields are salt ponds in Beimen District, Tainan, Taiwan.

History
Originally established in 1818 by salt farmers as the Laidong Salt Fields, the field is the oldest salt field in Taiwan. The site was originally a desert. It was then later procured by Taiwan Salt Company. In 1952, the field area was redesigned and the field became the only central-style tiled-paved salt field in Taiwan. Due to the declining business of salt industry, groups had been actively advocating for the revival of the field, thus the field had then been restored for tourism purpose.

Architecture
The fields consist of many individual square plots. In order to prevent salt crystals from adhering to the dirt, the plots are lined with pieces of broken pottery.

See also
 Agriculture in Taiwan

References

External links

 

1818 establishments in Taiwan
Farms in Taiwan
Landforms of Tainan
Salt production
Tourist attractions in Tainan